Maslozavod is a rural locality (a village) in Kubenskoye Rural Settlement, Vologodsky District, Vologda Oblast, Russia. The population was 11 as of 2002.

Geography 
The distance to Vologda is 43 km, to Kubenskoye is 13 km. Nesvoyskoye is the nearest rural locality.

References 

Rural localities in Vologodsky District